Bente Rogge (born 2 October 1997) is a Dutch water polo player for Arizona State Sun Devils and the Dutch national team. She wears cap number 5 while representing the Dutch National Team and cap number 12 for ASU. 

She participated at the 2018 Women's European Water Polo Championship.

References

1997 births
Living people
Dutch female water polo players
Expatriate water polo players
Dutch expatriate sportspeople in the United States
Arizona State Sun Devils women's water polo players
21st-century Dutch women